Japan competed at the 1968 Summer Olympics in Mexico City, Mexico. 171 competitors, 146 men and 25 women, took part in 97 events in 18 sports.

Medalists

| width=78% align=left valign=top |

| width=22% align=left valign=top |

Athletics

Men
Track & road events

Boxing

Men

Canoeing

Sprint 

men

Cycling

One cyclist represented Japan in 1968.

Track 
Sprint

Road 
Men

Diving

Men

Women

Equestrian

Fencing

Five fencers, all men, represented Japan in 1968.

Men's foil
 Heizaburo Okawa
 Kazuo Mano
 Fujio Shimizu

Men's team foil
 Masaya Fukuda, Heizaburo Okawa, Fujio Shimizu, Kazuhiko Wakasugi, Kazuo Mano

Football

Group play

Quarterfinals

Semi final

Bronze Medal Match

Gymnastics

Hockey

Modern pentathlon

Three male pentathletes represented Japan in 1968.

Individual
 Yuso Makihira
 Katsuaki Tashiro
 Toshio Fukui

Team
 Yuso Makihira
 Katsuaki Tashiro
 Toshio Fukui

Rowing

Men

Shooting

Six shooters, all men, represented Japan in 1968.
Open

Swimming

Volleyball

Men's Tournament

Group play

Women's Tournament 

Women's Team Competition
Round Robin
 Defeated United States (3-0)
 Defeated Mexico (3-0)
 Defeated Peru (3-0)
 Defeated Czechoslovakia (3-0)
 Defeated Poland (3-0)
 Defeated South Korea (3-0)
 Lost to Soviet Union (1-3) →  Silver Medal

Team Roster
Setsuko Yosjida
Suzue Takayama
Toyoko Iwahara
Youko Kasahara
Aiko Onozawa
Yukiyo Kojima
Sachiko Fukanaka
Kunie Shishikura
Setsuko Inoue
Sumie Oinuma
Makiko Furakawa
Keiko Hama

Water polo

Team Roster
Haruo Sato
Hirokatsu Kuwayama
Kazuya Takeuchi
Koji Nakano
Kunio Yonehara
Seiya Sakamoto
Shigeharu Kuwabara
Shuzo Yajima
Tetsunosuke Ishii

Group play

Weightlifting

Wrestling

References

External links
Official Olympic Reports
International Olympic Committee results database

Nations at the 1968 Summer Olympics
1968
Summer Olympics